Hollis Conway (born January 8, 1967) is a track and field high jumper and a two-time Olympic medalist. He is currently employed by Lafayette Consolidated Government as the PARC Director in Lafayette Mayor-President Josh Guillory's administration. Conway previously served as the Assistant Director of Diversity, Leadership, & Education for the Louisiana Ragin' Cajuns football team under head coach Billy Napier. Conway was the top-ranked high jumper in the U.S. seven straight years from 1988 to 1994 and in the world for two of those years (1990 and 1991). Conway, John Thomas and Dwight Stones are the only Americans to win two Olympic medals in the high jump.

Career
Born in Chicago, Illinois and a native of Shreveport, Louisiana, Conway went 7-8¾ in the event at the 1988 Summer Olympics in Seoul, Korea, setting a U.S. collegiate record and earning a silver medal. He won a bronze medal in the 1992 Summer Olympics in Barcelona, Spain after going 7-8½ in winning the U.S. Olympic Team Trials that year.

In 1989, Conway broke the American record twice in the high jump, winning the NCAA Men's Outdoor Track and Field Championship at 7-9¾ and the U.S. Olympic Festival at 7-10. He earned his first of two world No. 1 rankings in 1990 when he swept both the U.S. indoor and outdoor titles and won the Goodwill Games. He had ten jumps of 7-8 or better that year.

A six-time NCAA All-American and three-time NCAA champion at the University of Louisiana at Lafayette (then known as the University of Southwestern Louisiana). He established a new NCAA indoor record of 2.37m (7 ft-9½in) at the 1989 NCAA Indoor Championships: it remains as one of the longest-standing NCAA, and Championship Meet, records through 2011. He won the winner at the 1988 NCAA Men's Outdoor Track and Field Championship and at the 1989 he won with an American outdoor record height. Conway was ranked No. 1 in the world in 1991 by winning the IAAF World Indoor Championships in Athletics in Seville, Spain, with an American indoor record of 7-10½.

He defended his U.S. outdoor championship and won the 1991 World University Games, while finishing third in the 1991 Pan American Games and World Outdoor Championships. He was ranked third in the world in 1992 and 1993. He was a Goodwill Games runner-up in 1994.

In all, Conway won ten USA championship high jump titles (five outdoor, five indoor) before his retirement at the 2000 Drake Relays (where he jumped 6 ft 9in, on 29 April 2000). He is a member of the Louisiana Sports Hall of Fame and was inducted into the Drake Relays Hall of Fame in 1999. Conway wrote the foreword of the Complete Book of Jumps (Human Kinetics Europe Ltd, 1995).

Height differential
Conway jumped off his left foot and is considered short in stature, in comparison to other world-class high jumpers, many of whom stand 6'3"-to-6'5". His personal details on file with the IAAF officially list his height and weight as 1.83m and 68 kg, which equate to 6 feet one-quarter inch, and 150 pounds. However, in a high jump instructional video produced in 1991, which features Conway and his coach, Dick Booth, the narrator states Conway is "six feet one-half inch" (1.84m) and weighs "one hundred forty-five pounds." The narrator also says Conway has "average" speed, running 10.8 seconds for 100 meters, as well as having only an "average" vertical leap of 31 inches. At six feet tall, Conway has held a distinction with four others in track and field history for jumping over their own heights. Conway's best jump was 22-1/4 inches (57 cm) above his head.

International competitions

References

External links
Official website
 
  
 
 
 
 
Conway Admitted to Louisiana High School Hall of Fame

1967 births
Living people
American male high jumpers
Athletes (track and field) at the 1988 Summer Olympics
Athletes (track and field) at the 1991 Pan American Games
Athletes (track and field) at the 1992 Summer Olympics
Goodwill Games medalists in athletics
Louisiana Ragin' Cajuns men's track and field athletes
Medalists at the 1988 Summer Olympics
Medalists at the 1992 Summer Olympics
Olympic bronze medalists for the United States in track and field
Olympic silver medalists for the United States in track and field
Pan American Games bronze medalists for the United States
Pan American Games track and field athletes for the United States
Pan American Games medalists in athletics (track and field)
Sportspeople from Shreveport, Louisiana
Track and field athletes from Louisiana
Track and field athletes from Chicago
Universiade gold medalists for the United States
Universiade medalists in athletics (track and field)
Universiade silver medalists for the United States
World Athletics Championships athletes for the United States
World Athletics Championships medalists
World Athletics Indoor Championships winners
Medalists at the 1989 Summer Universiade
Medalists at the 1991 Summer Universiade
Competitors at the 1990 Goodwill Games
Competitors at the 1994 Goodwill Games
Medalists at the 1991 Pan American Games